Set Me Free is a 1999 Canadian coming-of-age drama film by Léa Pool and starring Karine Vanasse. It tells the story of Hanna, a girl struggling with her sexuality and the depression of both her parents as she goes through puberty in Quebec in 1963. The film heavily references the French new-wave film Vivre sa vie by Jean-Luc Godard.

The film won critical acclaim and several awards, both for Pool and Vanasse, including being named the year's best Canadian feature by the Toronto Film Critics Association.

Plot
In 1963, Hanna, a 13-year old girl, is living on a farm in rural Quebec with her grandparents and uncle (who apparently has a developmental disability such as Down Syndrome) when she gets her first period. Soon after, she interrupts family dinner when her father calls her, much to her grandmother's annoyance. The onset of puberty (and her grandmother's relatively non-supportive explanation of it), as well as hearing from her father, trigger her decision to return to her parents in Montreal.

Hanna is welcomed back by her brother, Paul, to the small family apartment, where the rent is often overdue, sometimes paid with cash raised from pawning household items.  Hanna's father is an aspiring poet, a Polish Jew who had survived the Holocaust in France.  Although overbearing and even sometimes abusive to his wife and children, he can show love and tenderness as well. Hoping to connect with his daughter, he encourages her to read The Diary of Anne Frank and speaks about his former wife who had been killed by the Nazis, but he also acts intolerant and demanding.  Hanna's mother is depressive, working overtime in a sewing factory to make ends meet but also spending hours at home typing the poems her husband dictates to her.  Though often angry with him, Hanna's mother also confesses that she needs him.  On rare occasions when she has time and energy to connect with her daughter, she stops short of going into more meaningful detail.

As Hanna wrestles with her changing body and emotions, she has a key experience when she sneaks into a movie theater showing Jean-Luc Godard's Vivre Sa Vie (My Life to Live) and is entranced by the character Nana, played by Anna Karina, and her philosophy of personal responsibility.  On her first day at a new school, Hanna sets herself apart from other students by admitting that her parents aren't married and that she does not consider herself either Jewish, after her father, or Catholic, after her mother.  Hanna's teacher notices her and later comes to her defense when a classmate taunts Hanna on the playground with anti-Semitic slurs.  The teacher herself physically resembles Karina, and Hanna seems to develop a crush on her.  The teacher admires Hanna's independence but advises her to develop her own view of life and not to rely on a role model who dies tragically at the end of the filmm.

Hanna also adopts poses and clothing choices from Karina in Godard's film, while she continues to explore her feelings and sexuality.  She attends a dance with a school friend, Laura, and the two wind up kissing each other.  Later, she introduces Laura to Paul and the three spend time together in ways that reflect how each awkwardly attempts to come to terms with what each is feeling.  Hanna herself seems increasingly isolated.

After a tempestuous quarrel with her husband, Hanna's mother attempts suicide.  Visiting her in the hospital, Hanna is distraught when the sedated woman is unresponsive to her pleas for connection.  When her father later sends Hanna to the local baker to get a loaf of bread, the baker takes her to his back kitchen, gropes her, and then gives her both the bread and some money.  Hanna is upset by the incident but also seems to find it provocative.

Following a violent quarrel between Hanna and her father, she and Paul leave home, but she does not return to the apartment.  Wandering into the city's red-light district, she befriends a lost dog but also adopts the pose and attitudes of a prostitute like Karina's character.  When a man does pick her up and takes her to a cheap hotel room, she changes her mind as he tries to force himself on her and flees.

Driven almost to despair, Hanna collapses on her teacher's doorstep, where she and the dog are discovered in the morning.  Returning to the family apartment, Hanna's father welcomes her back with a dinner prepared to restore her strength.  Having returned to school, Hanna at the season's end is loaned a small movie camera by her teacher, who assures her that she will soon learn how to use it.  The film ends with shots from the camera of Hanna's mother as they head to the grandparents' house for the summer.

Cast
 Karine Vanasse as Hanna
 Pascale Bussières as Hanna's mother
 Miki Manojlovic as Hanna's father
 Alexandre Mérineau as Paul, Hanna's brother
 Charlotte Christeler as Laura
 Nancy Huston as Teacher
 Monique Mercure as Hanna's grandmother
 Jacques Galipeau as Hanna's grandfather
 Carl Hennebert-Faulkner as Martin
 Michel Albert as security guard

Reception
Emporte-Moi was well received by critics, and was given an average rating of 8/10 by reviewers. Critics generally praised the film's bittersweet tone and the performances, particularly that of Vanasse. Still, some, such as Roger Ebert, criticised the film's ending for seeming somewhat forced.

On Autostraddle’s list of the 200 Best Lesbian, Bisexual & Queer Movies of All Time, Set Me Free was ranked at number 34.

Emporte-Moi, released in the United States on a single screen, grossed $74,052 at the box-office.

Awards
Emporte-Moi received various awards. Pool earned Genie nominations for Best Director and Best Screenplay, and the film was awarded the Toronto Film Critics Association Award for Best Canadian Film of 1999. At the Toronto International Film Festival, Emporte-moi was awarded the Special Jury Citation for Best Canadian Feature Film, and Vanasse earned the Special Jury Congratulation for her work on the film. It also received four Jutra awards, for Best Actress (Vanasse), Supporting Actress (Bussières), Direction, and Art Direction, and was nominated in four other categories.

Internationally, the film received the Swiss Film Prize and was nominated for the Golden Bear at the 49th Berlin International Film Festival. It was also honoured at international film festivals in the United States, Italy, Belgium, Bosnia, and Spain.

See also
 List of submissions to the 72nd Academy Awards for Best Foreign Language Film
 List of Canadian submissions for the Academy Award for Best Foreign Language Film
 List of LGBT films directed by women

References

External links
 
 
 

1999 films
1999 independent films
1999 LGBT-related films
1990s Canadian films
1990s coming-of-age drama films
1990s French films
1990s French-language films
1990s teen drama films
Canadian coming-of-age drama films
Canadian LGBT-related films
Canadian teen drama films
Films about LGBT and Judaism
Films about puberty
Films directed by Léa Pool
Films set in 1963
Films set in Montreal
French coming-of-age drama films
French LGBT-related films
French teen drama films
French-language Canadian films
French-language Swiss films
Lesbian-related films
LGBT-related coming-of-age films
LGBT-related drama films
Swiss coming-of-age films
Swiss drama films
Swiss LGBT-related films
Teen LGBT-related films